Gilles Bourdouleix (born 15 April 1960 in Angers, Maine-et-Loire) is a French politician and former member of the National Assembly of France.  He was the deputy for Maine-et-Loire's 5th constituency from 2002 to 2017. He is also the former spokesman of the National Centre of Independents and Peasants, of which he has been the president since 24 October 2009. Bourdouleix was a founding member of the Union of Democrats and Independents, a party from which he resigned on 24 July 2013.

Political life 
Gilles Bourdouleix was elected mayor of Cholet the first time on 19 June 1995 with a lead of 148 votes. He succeeded Maurice Ligot who was his chief of staff. He was elected mayor again in the second round of voting in March 2001 with 61.69% of the votes. He was again reelected in 2008.

In 2002, Bourdouleix was elected a member of the National Assembly of France as a member of the UMP. He has continued to serve in the office since then, though switching parties to Union of Democrats and Independents for his third election in 2012 and then leaving parties all together in August 2013.  Bourdouleix represents the department of Maine-et-Loire.

Controversy 
In July 2013, French blogger Benjamin Charles-Lemaire revealed that Bourdouleix said Adolf Hitler had not killed enough Romani people. Bourdouleix, who had been faced with Nazi salutes and accusations of racism, is said to have stated about a group of Romani people in exasperation, "It's almost as if Hitler didn't kill enough [of them]." On 22 July these remarks were reported in the French newspaper Le Courrier de l'Ouest which led to a significant political outcry against Bourdouleix. Bourdouleix went on to defend himself saying, "You all call me Hitler, and you think that's okay, no?" He then went on to clarify, "[I said that] if I were Hitler, these people here would be killed. There, that's basically what I said."

After Bourdouleix refuted comments published by Lemaire, Le Courrier de l'Ouest published audio recording in order to verify their claims, and a forensic analysis of the recording certified it as authentic. This, along with the initial accusations, led to an investigation of Bourdouleix by the Criminal Court of Angers which charged him with condoning crimes against humanity and defamation of the newspaper Le Courrier de l'Ouest. On 23 January 2014 Bourdouleix was found guilty of the charge and was fined 3,000 euros, though his fine was suspended. On 12 August 2014 Bourdouleix's conviction was upheld by the  Court of Appeal. On 15 December 2015 the Court of Appeal cancelled the sentence.

References

1960 births
Living people
People from Angers
National Centre of Independents and Peasants politicians
Mayors of places in Pays de la Loire
People from Cholet
Union for a Popular Movement politicians
Deputies of the 12th National Assembly of the French Fifth Republic
Deputies of the 13th National Assembly of the French Fifth Republic
Deputies of the 14th National Assembly of the French Fifth Republic
Union of Democrats and Independents politicians